New Style Radio 98.7 FM is a community radio station based in Birmingham, England, and broadcasting to the city's African-Caribbean community. The station, launched on 14 August 2002, was born out of 15 years of short-term radio broadcasting and training, including a long run of Restricted Service Licence activities.

The service is intended to be reflective of African-Caribbean culture and aspiration in particular and of multicultural Birmingham in general. It is historical in being the first licensed African-Caribbean radio station in Britain.

New Style Radio is run mainly by unpaid volunteers and is part of the Afro-Caribbean Millennium Centre, a registered charity set up to support the educational and social needs of the Afro-Caribbean community in the West Midlands.

In 2020, Ofcom censured the station for broadcasting COVID-19 conspiracy theories on a discussion segment.

References

External links
Official site
New Style Radio on the MediaUK website

Afro-Caribbean culture in England
Community radio stations in the United Kingdom
Radio stations in Birmingham, West Midlands